Gavin Francis (born 1975) is a Scottish physician and a writer on travel and medical matters. He was raised in Fife, Scotland and now lives in Edinburgh as a GP. His books have won many prestigious prizes.

Biography
Born in Fife in 1975, Francis studied medicine at the University of Edinburgh and joined the Emergency department at the old Royal Edinburgh Hospital. Having qualified as a physician, Francis spent ten years travelling on all seven continents. Francis spent time working in India and Africa, made several trips to the Arctic, and is said to have crossed Eurasia and Australasia by motorcycle.

Francis was working at the Royal Hospital for Sick Children, Edinburgh when he decided to undertake a 15-month position as the resident doctor with the British Antarctic Survey. He arrived at the Halley Research Station in Antarctica via the RRS Ernest Shackleton, a supply ship, on Christmas Eve, 2002, after a two-month voyage.

Writings
Francis's experiences eventually formed the basis for his second book, Empire Antarctica (2012); his first book, True North: Travels in Arctic Europe (2008), detailed his experiences travelling in Arctic Europe from Unst to Svalbard.

His Adventures in Human Being (2015) won the Saltire Society Literary Award for non-fiction and was a British Medical Association (BMA) book of the year. Empire Antarctica was a shortlisted finalist for a number of book awards in 2013, including the Ondaatje Prize and the Saltire Prize, but received its most notable honour in November 2013 at the Lennoxlove Book Festival when it was named the 2013 Scottish Mortgage Investment Trust's Scottish Book of the Year.

Francis has been contributing articles and reviews to The Guardian since 2010, the London Review of Books, and the New York Review of Books since 2013. In addition to book reviews, his contributions have occasionally consisted of prose ruminations on medical topics such as stethoscopes and the human brain, an approach that led to his being commissioned by the Wellcome Trust to produce a collection of essays in this style.

His 2020 book Island Dreams was "a simple but sincere cartography of my own obsession with the twinned but opposing allures of island and city, of isolation and connection", and included 90 maps. In 2021 he published Intensive Care: A GP, a community & COVID-19 describing his work in Edinburgh and Orkney during the COVID-19 pandemic.

Selected publications

Books
Intensive Care: A GP, a Community & COVID-19 (Wellcome Collection,)
Island Dreams: Mapping an Obsession (Canongate Books,)
Shapeshifters: A Journey Through the Changing Human Body (Wellcome Collection 2018) 
Adventures in Human Being (Profile Books 2015) 
Empire Antarctica: Ice, Silence & Emperor Penguins (Chatto & Windus 2012) 
True North: Travels in Arctic Europe (Polygon 2008, 2010)

Translations
Empire Antarctica: Eis, Totenstille & Kaiserpinguine (DuMont 2013) , in German
Island Dreams. Mapping an Obsession: INSELN. Die Kartierung einer Sehnsucht (DuMont 2020) , in German

Articles
 Gavin Francis, "Changing Psychiatry's Mind" (review of Anne Harrington, Mind Fixers: Psychiatry's Troubled Search for the Biology of Mental Illness, Norton, 366 pp.; and Nathan Filer, This Book Will Change Your Mind about Mental Health: A Journey into the Heartland of Psychiatry, London, Faber and Faber, 248 pp.), The New York Review of Books, vol. LXVIII, no. 1 (14 January 2021), pp. 26–29. "[M]ental disorders are different [from illnesses addressed by other medical specialties].... To treat them as purely physical is to misunderstand their nature." "[C]are [needs to be] based on distress and [cognitive, emotional, and physical] need rather than [on psychiatric] diagnos[is]", which is often uncertain, erratic, and unreplicable. (p. 29.)

Awards and honours
2013 Scottish Mortgage Investment Trust Book of the Year: Empire Antarctica
2013 Ondaatje Prize: Empire Antarctica (shortlist)
2013 Saltire Prize Book of the Year: Empire Antarctica (shortlist)
2013 Costa Book of the Year: Empire Antarctica (shortlist)
2013 Banff Mountain Book Competition: Empire Antarctica (shortlisted finalist)

References

External links
"Antarctic Holiday: A Christmas Feast In The Loneliest Spot On Earth." – modified excerpt from "Empire Antarctica", NPR. 20 December 2014
"Introduction to A Fortunate Man." – Gavin Francis's introduction to the 2015 reprint of John Berger's A Fortunate Man (1967)

Alumni of the University of Edinburgh
People from Fife
21st-century Scottish writers
21st-century Scottish medical doctors
1975 births
Living people